Publishing is the activity of making information, literature, music, software and other content available to the public for sale or for free. Traditionally, the term refers to the creation and distribution of printed works, such as books, newspapers, and magazines. With the advent of digital information systems, the scope has expanded to include digital publishing such as ebooks, digital magazines, websites, social media, music, and video game publishing. 

The commercial publishing industry ranges from large multinational conglomerates such as News Corp, Pearson, Penguin Random House and Thomson Reuters, also major retail brands and thousands of small independent publishers. It has various divisions such as trade/retail publishing of fiction and non-fiction, educational publishing and academic and scientific publishing. Publishing is also undertaken by governments, civil society and private companies for administrative or compliance requirements, business, research, advocacy or public interest objectives. This can include annual reports, research reports, market research, policy briefings and technical reports. Self-publishing has become very common.

"Publisher" can refer to a publishing company or organization, or to an individual who leads a publishing company, imprint, periodical or newspaper.

Stages of publishing
The publishing process covering most magazine, journal and book publishers include: (Different stages are applicable to different types of publisher)

Types of publishers

Newspaper publishing
Newspapers or news websites are publications of current reports, articles and features wrote by Journalists and are available for free, available for free with a premium edition, or paid for, either individually or on a subscription. They are filled with photographs or other media and normally subsidised with advertising. They can have local, national, international news or feature a particular industry. They can charge premium prices when they have expert and exclusive knowledge. They are intended to act in the public interest, hold people and businesses to account and promote freedom of information and expression.Editors manage the tone-of-voice of their publication, for example negative versus positive articles can affect everyone's outlook.

Journal publishing
A journal is an academic or technical publication also available in digital formats, containing articles written by researchers, professors and experts. These publications are specific in a particular field and often push the boundaries of human knowledge. They normally have peer review processes before publishing to test the validity and quality of the content.

Magazine publishing
A magazine is a periodical published at regular intervals with creative layouts, photography and illustrations that cover a particular subject or interest. They are available in print or digital formats and can be purchased on apps/websites like Readly or available for free on apps/websites like Issuu.

Book publishing 
The global book publishing industry consists of books that are categorised into either fiction or non-fiction and print, ebook or audiobook. The market for books is huge with around 1.5 billion people speaking English, with translation services easily accessible to access the rest. The best content gets sold as TV and film rights. Self-publishing makes publishing accessible to everyone either with small print-run digital printing or online self-publishing platforms. E-reader screen technology continues to improve with increasing contrast and resolution making them more comfortable to read. Each book has a registered ISBN number to identify it.

Directory publishing
Directories are searchable Indexed data containing businesses, products and services. These were in the past printed but are now mostly online. Directories are now available as searchable lists, on a map, as a sector specific portal, as a review site (expert or consumer) or as a comparison site. Although the businesses may not consider themselves as publishers, the way the data is displayed is published.

Textbook publishing
A textbook is an educational book or an ebook containing knowledge about a particular subject that is used by people studying certain subjects. Textbook publishing continues to be needed due to the global need for education.Textbooks from major publishers are being integrated with learning platforms for expert knowledge and access to a library of books with digital content.A university press is an academic publisher run by a university, Oxford University Press is the largest in the world and specialises in research, education and English language teaching internationally.

Catalog Publishing
A Catalog (or Catalogue) is a visual directory or list of a large range of products that you can browse and buy from a particular company. In printed form, this is usually in the format of a soft-back book or directory. Smaller visual catalogs can be known as brochures. With the internet they have evolved into searchable databases of products known under the term e-commerce. Interactive catalogs and brochures like IKEA and Avon allow the customer to browse a full range if they have not decided on their purchase. Responsive web and app design will allow further integration between interactive catalog visuals and searchable product databases.

Web publishing
All the world’s knowledge up to recently has been put in books. For accessibility and global reach, this content can be repurposed to the web. The British Library, for example, holds more than 170 million items, with 3 million new additions each year. With consent, content can be published online through ebooks, audiobooks, CMS based websites, online learning platforms, videos or mobile apps. Online, writers and copy editors are known as content writers and content editors although their roles vary from their print based alternatives.

Advertising
Advertising can provide income or a subsidised income for publishers. If there is a return on investment (ROI) from the advertising it makes exponentially more money by increasing the spend, ROI of up to £10 per £1 invested is possible, the John Lewis & Partners Christmas campaigns achieved those figures. Likewise any cost savings that harm the customer/consumer experience can affect a brand in the long term. Multichannel marketing can be more cost effective at creating an immersive experience which can’t be replicated with one channel. For example, think about a shop that has a small or no margin compared to a website, if you consider the shop as marketing spend, it is very cost effective marketing, the shop is a huge billboard, you have a browsing experience that enables consumers to make purchasing decisions, they get to feel the brand, it has a presence in the community and creates jobs. Also using social media publishing to advertise has a good return on investment if you can create trending high quality content that reflects positively on the brand.

Tie-in publishing

Film, television, radio and advertisements publish information to their audiences. Computer games, streaming apps and social media publish content in new and various ways that can keep audiences more engaged. Marketing of a major film such as Star Wars is an example of tie-in publishing and can include a spin-off book, a graphic novel, a soundtrack album, a computer game, models, toys, social media posts, and promotional publications. Examples of tie-in publishing based on books are the Harry Potter and James Bond franchises.

Book publishing sub-divisions

There are four major types of publishers in book publishing:
 Commercial publishers are more rigid and selective as to which books, they publish. If accepted, authors pay no costs to publish in exchange for selling rights to their work. They receive in-house editing, design, printing, marketing and distribution services, and are paid royalties on sales.
 Self-publishers: Authors use self-publishing houses to publish their books and retain full rights to their works. Self-publishing houses are more open than traditional publishing houses, allowing emerging and established authors to publish their work. A number of modern or self-publishing houses offer enhanced services (e.g. editing, design) and authors may choose which one to use. Authors shoulder pre-publishing expenses and in return retain all the rights to their works, keep total control, and are paid royalties on sales.  
 Vanity presses portray themselves as traditional publishers but are, in fact, just a self-publishing service. Unlike genuine self-publishing services, the author is often obliged to use some or all of their additional services, and the press will often take rights to the work as part of their contract.
 Hybrid publishers operate with a different revenue model than traditional publishing, while keeping the rest of the practices of publishing the same. There have been attempts to bridge this gap using hybrid models. No one model has been fully proven at this stage.

In 2013, Penguin (owned by Pearson) and Random House (owned by Bertelsmann) merged, narrowing the industry to a handful of big publishers as it adapted to digital media. The merger created the largest consumer book publisher in the world, with a global market share of more than 25 percent. Approximately 60% of English-language books are produced through the "Big Five" publishing houses: Penguin Random House, Hachette, HarperCollins, Simon & Schuster, and Macmillan. In November 2020, ViacomCBS agreed to sell Simon & Schuster, the third largest book publisher in the United States, to Penguin Random House in a deal that will create the first mega publisher. On November 2, 2021, the United States Department of Justice filed a lawsuit (U.S. v. Bertelsmann SE & CO. KGaA, et al.) to block the merger on anti-trust grounds, and on October 31st, 2022, the  D.C. District Court ruled in favour of the Department of Justice, filing a permanent injunction on the merger. 

Derided in the 1911 Encyclopædia Britannica as "a purely commercial affair" that cared more about profits than about literary quality, publishing is like any business, with a need for the expenses not to exceed the income. Publishing is now a major industry with the largest companies Reed Elsevier and Pearson PLC having global publishing operations.

Some businesses maximize their profit margins through vertical integration; book publishing is not one of them. Although newspaper and magazine companies still often own printing presses and binderies, book publishers rarely do. Similarly, the trade usually sells the finished products through a distributor who stores and distributes the publisher's wares for a percentage fee or sells on a sale or return basis.

The advent of the Internet has provided the electronic way of book distribution without the need of physical printing, physical delivery and storage of books.

Within the electronic book path, the publishing house's role remains almost identical.  The process of preparing a book for ebook publication is exactly the same as print publication, with only minor variations in the process to account for the different mediums of publishing.  While some costs, such as the discount given to retailers (normally around 45%) are eliminated, 

Print on demand is rapidly becoming an established alternative to traditional publishing.

Book clubs are almost entirely direct-to-retail, and niche publishers pursue a mixed strategy to sell through all available outlets — their output is insignificant to the major booksellers, so lost revenue poses no threat to the traditional symbiotic relationships between the four activities of printing, publishing, distribution, and retail.

Some of the major publishers have entire divisions devoted to a single franchise, e.g., Ballantine Del Rey Lucasbooks has the exclusive rights to Star Wars in the United States; Random House UK (Bertelsmann)/Century LucasBooks holds the same rights in the United Kingdom. The game industry self-publishes through BL Publishing/Black Library (Warhammer) and Wizards of the Coast (Dragonlance, Forgotten Realms, etc.). The BBC has its publishing division that does very well with long-running series such as Doctor Who. These multimedia works are cross-marketed aggressively and sales frequently outperform the average stand-alone published work, making them a focus of corporate interest.

Recent developments
Accessible publishing uses the digitization of books to mark-up books into XML and then produces multiple formats from this to sell to customers, often targeting those with difficulty reading. Formats include a variety larger print sizes, specialized print formats for dyslexia, eye tracking problems and macular degeneration, as well as Braille, DAISY, audiobooks and ebooks.

Green publishing means adapting the publishing process to minimise environmental impact. One example of this is the concept of on-demand printing, using digital or print-on-demand technology. This cuts down the need to ship books since they are manufactured close to the customer on a just-in-time basis.

A further development is the growth of on-line publishing where no physical books are produced. The ebook is created by the author and uploaded to a website from where it can be downloaded and read by anyone.

An increasing number of authors are using niche marketing online to sell more books by engaging with their readers online.

Standardization
Refer to the ISO divisions of ICS 01.140.40 and 35.240.30 for further information.

Legal issues

Publication is the distribution of copies or content to the public.  The Berne Convention requires that this can only be done with the consent of the copyright holder, which is initially always the author.  In the Universal Copyright Convention, "publication" is defined in article VI as "the reproduction in tangible form and the general distribution to the public of copies of a work from which it can be read or otherwise visually perceived."

Privishing
Privishing (private publishing, but not to be confused with self-publishing) is a modern term for publishing a book but printing so few copies or with such lack of marketing, advertising or sales support that it effectively does not reach the public. The book, while nominally published, is almost impossible to obtain through normal channels such as bookshops, often cannot be ordered specially, and has a notable lack of support from its publisher, including refusal to reprint the title. A book that is privished may be referred to as "killed". Depending on the motivation, privishing may constitute breach of contract, censorship, or good business practice (e.g., not printing more books than the publisher believes will sell in a reasonable length of time).

History 

Publishing became possible with the invention of writing, and became more practical upon the introduction of printing. Prior to printing, distributed works were copied manually, by scribes. Due to printing, publishing progressed hand-in-hand with the development of books.

The Chinese inventor Bi Sheng made movable type of earthenware circa 1045, but there are no known surviving examples of his work. The Korean civil servant Choe Yun-ui, who lived during the Goryeo Dynasty, invented the first metal moveable type in 1234–1250 AD  
 
Around 1450, in what is commonly regarded as an independent invention, Johannes Gutenberg invented movable type in Europe, along with innovations in casting the type based on a matrix and hand mould. This invention gradually made books less expensive to produce and more widely available.

Early printed books, single sheets and images which were created before 1501 in Europe are known as incunables or incunabula. "A man born in 1453, the year of the fall of Constantinople, could look back from his fiftieth year on a lifetime in which about eight million books had been printed, more perhaps than all the scribes of Europe had produced since Constantine founded his city in A.D. 330."

Eventually, printing enabled other forms of publishing besides books. The history of modern newspaper publishing started in Germany in 1609, with publishing of magazines following in 1663.

Missionaries brought printing presses to sub-Saharan Africa in the mid-18th century.

Historically, publishing has been handled by publishers, although some authors self-published. The establishment of the World Wide Web in 1989 soon propelled the website into a dominant medium of publishing. Wikis and Blogs soon developed, followed by online books, online newspapers, and online magazines.

Since its start, the World Wide Web has been facilitating the technological convergence of commercial and self-published content, as well as the convergence of publishing and producing into online production through the development of multimedia content.

A U.S.-based study in 2016 that surveyed 34 publishers found that the publishing industry in the US in general is overwhelmingly represented by straight, able bodied, white females. Salon described the situation as "lack of diversity behind the scenes in book world". A survey in 2020 by the same group found there has been no statistical significant change in the lack of diversity since the 2016 survey four years earlier. Lack of diversity in the American publishing industry has been an issue for years. Within the industry, there was the least amount of diversity in higher level editorial positions.

See also

References

External links 

 International Publishers' organisation
Printing and publishing – Law Insider

 
Mass media industry